The Trustees of Columbia University in the City of New York is the governing board of Columbia University in New York City. Founded in 1754, it is also referred to as the Columbia Corporation, as distinguished from affiliates of the University that are separate legal entities, such as Barnard College. The board of trustees was originally composed of ex officio members including officials from the New York colonial government, crown officials, and various protestant ministers from the city. Following the college's resuscitation following the American Revolutionary War, it was placed under the control of the Board of Regents of the University of the State of New York, and the university would finally come under the control of a private board of trustees in 1787. The board is notable for having administered the Pulitzer Prize from the prize's establishment until 1975. It consists of 24 members and as of 2021 is co-chaired by Lisa Carnoy and Jonathan Lavine.

Structure and function 

The board is governed by 24 trustees, including the president of the university, who serves ex officio. Six of the 24 candidates are nominated from a pool of candidates selected by the Columbia Alumni Association. Another six are nominated by the board in consultation with the University Senate. The remaining 12 are nominated by the trustees through an internal process. The board elects its own chair; the first woman to serve as chair (and the first to chair the governing board of any Ivy League university) was Gertrude Michelson, elected in 1989. The term of office for the trustees is six years and trustees serve for no more than two consecutive terms.  

The trustees have met in room dedicated to them in Low Memorial Library since 1897. They select the President, oversee all faculty and senior administrative appointments, monitor the budget, supervise the endowment, and protect university property. The board of trustees holds the exclusive power to grant degrees, including to the affiliated institutions of Barnard College and Teachers College. The trustees also oversaw the Pulitzer Prizes until 1975, when authority over the prizes was devolved to a separate board.

Early history

The board of trustees was originally established in 1754 as the board of governors of King's College with 41 members, replacing the ten-member Lottery Commission appointed by the New York Assembly to oversee lottery funds allocated to the establishment of the college. The board of governors originally included several ex officio members, including, crown officials, members of the colonial government, and ministers of various protestant denominations:

A further twenty-four individuals were named in the charter, serving without terms with their successors to be selected by subsequent governors. College faculty were not provided seats ex officio on the board of governors, at variance with contemporary practice at the Universities of Oxford and Cambridge, where the faculty was engaged in the governance of their colleges, but was very much in line with practice of other colonial colleges governed by external boards.

The charter permitted Protestants to serve as governors but excluded Roman Catholics and Jews. Only three members would be Anglicans: the Archbishop of Canterbury, the rector of Trinity Church, and the President of Columbia University, and they were offset by four ex officio members selected from New York's Dutch Reformed Church, French Church, Lutheran Church, and Presbyterian Church. In practice, the board was dominated by Anglicans, members of the Trinity Church, and the Dutch Reformed Church. Of the fifty-nine men who served as governors, only three ex officio members were not from the Anglican or Dutch Reformed churches. 

More than half of the fifty-nine New Yorkers who served as governor made their livings as merchants. The next most common occupation among the governors was law (20 percent), followed by ministers (16 percent), and there was only one doctor. The governors met 102 times in 22 years and most meetings were attended by around fifteen governors. A quarter of the governors attended fewer than ten meetings, and another half were absent, leaving a core of sixteen governors. Academic matters such as faculty appointments, the curriculum, and admissions requirements were overseen by degree-bearing ministers, while governors drawing from the city's mercantile and legal ranks oversaw financial matters such as construction of collegiate buildings or the salary of the college steward. This informal division of duties survived the reorganization of the King's College into Columbia College and persisted into the 1960s.

In terms of politics, the ratio of Loyalists to Patriots during the American Revolution among the governors was more than eight to one.

In 1784, it became the Board of Regents of Columbia College. It was renamed in 1787 as the trustees, and arrived at its final name of The Trustees of Columbia University in the City of New York by an order from the Supreme Court of New York in 1912, 16 years after Columbia College was renamed as Columbia University.

Controversies

Although the trustees usually approve faculty recommendations for hiring and dismissal of Columbia faculty, in some cases they have taken a more direct role. Notably, in 1917 they fired psychologist James McKeen Cattell for his anti-war and anti-conscription views, a case with ongoing significance for academic freedom.

The trustees' oversight of the Pulitzer Prizes, which ended in 1975, was not without controversy. An early example of this occurred in 1921, when the trustees overruled the jury recommendation and awarded the fiction prize to Edith Wharton for The Age of Innocence instead of the recommendation of Sinclair Lewis for Main Street. A similar controversy ensued in 1962, when the trustees overruled the jury's choice of a biography of William Randolph Hearst by W. A. Swanberg, Citizen Hearst, instead choosing to give no award in that category.

The trustees have been blamed for the violent suppression of protestors in the Columbia University protests of 1968, after they instructed the university administration to call in the police against the protestors and later lauded the police for their efforts.

In 2001, the trustees were accused of pressuring the university to water down its sexual misconduct policy, and the director of the Office of Sexual Misconduct Prevention and Education resigned in protest, claiming that the trustees had directed her not to discuss the policy changes.

As with most governing boards of private universities, the deliberations of the trustees are confidential, and despite any internal disagreements the trustees generally present a unified front to the public on the decisions they have taken. A notable exception to this occurred in 2012, when trustee José A. Cabranes published a dissenting opinion on the status of Columbia College and its core curriculum within the university, in a column in Columbia's student newspaper, the Columbia Daily Spectator.

Current trustees 
The board consists of the following members as of September 2021, according to Columbia University's official website and the biographies of the trustees:

Notable past trustees 
According to the University website and Columbia Daily Spectator archives, the following people have served as trustees in the past:

References

External Links 
 Official website

Columbia University
Governing bodies of universities and colleges in the United States